"La Adelita" is one of the most famous corridos of the Mexican Revolution. Over the years, it has had many adaptations. This particular version of the ballad was inspired by a Chihuahuense woman who joined the Maderista movement in the early stages of the Revolution and fell in love with Madero. She became a popular icon and the source who documented the role of women in the Mexican Revolution; she gradually became synonymous with the term soldadera, who became a vital force in the Revolutionary War efforts due to their participation in the battles against Mexican government forces.

However, the song, the portrait, and the role of its subject have been given different, often conflicting, interpretations. It has also been argued that "La Adelita expressed the sensitivity and vulnerability of men, emphasizing the stoicism of the rebellious male soldier as he confronts the prospect of death".In another interpretation of this icon, the feminist scholar María Herrara-Sobek argues, "Adelita's bravery and revolutionary spirit are lost to the fatalism and insecurities of male soldiers who are focused on passions, love, and desire as they face combat".

Why Women Joined the Mexican Revolution 
The song "La Adelita" depicts the brave women who fought and traveled with the Federales and the revolutionary army. The song speaks of Adelita as someone who is pretty but has the courage and is the object of desire for many of the soldiers. However, this was not the case. La Adeilta is based on real-life camp followers and soldaderas that bravely fought and traveled side by side with soldiers. These women ranged from young girls to middle-aged women and were from all over the country, including, but not limited to, Oaxaca, Morelos, Tehuantepec, Central Mexico, and Sonora. According to some observers, these women were also often of mestiza or indigenous origin. There were many reasons these women joined the Mexican Revolution. Some joined because of the poor economic situation in Mexico at the time. Unable to find other jobs, women joined to take care of the soldiers. Women were also forced to join the military when Mexican President Victoriano Huerta increased the quota for his standing army, which included forcing women to go to the front and work as cooks. Additionally, many women were coerced to go with their husbands once they were either drafted or chose to join. Or some women decided to follow their husbands as loyal wives. Finally, some women were left with no choice, like Angela Jimenez, who at the age of fifteen had Federales soldiers search her home for rebels and try to force themselves on her sister, resulting in her death. Enraged by this experience, Jimenez started to dress as a boy and go by the name "Angel" to join her father on the rebel front lines.

The Role of Soldaderas 
Women played multiple different roles while serving in the military and military camps. One of the primary roles of women in the Mexican Revolution was the making and cooking tortillas. Specifically, Zapatistas relied heavily on the relationship between the military and villages to get food. This relationship required the willingness and commitment of women in the villages to make these tortillas for the soldiers all day and allow them to collect them later. Without this relationship, it is possible that soldiers would have died of starvation as there was no food network set up to feed these men. However, this relationship was not the only one between Zapatistas and women. Due to not having any camp followers, Zapatistas would kidnap and rape women from the same villages where they got their food. Other military factions, like the Orozquistas, had camp followers to make food for the soldiers instead of the village system. In addition to cooking food for the male soldiers, women in military camps also acted as spies, medical attendants, nurses, messengers, and smugglers. Specifically, soldaderas would spy in enemy camps, steal documents, and smuggle United States’ arms over the border into Mexico.

The Difference Between a Soldadera and a Female Soldier 
Despite common belief, the terms soldaderas and female soldiers are not necessarily interchangeable. The term soldaderas usually applies to the women who provided for the soldiers. Soldaderas are the ones who make food and act as nurses. Female soldiers differed from soldaderas, but that does not discount all the valuable work soldaderas did for the Mexican Revolution. Female soldiers and soldaderas usually came from different backgrounds. Female soldiers in the Mexican Revolution usually had higher social standings, while soldaderas were generally from poor indigenous backgrounds. Female soldiers also had different roles. Female soldiers fought alongside the male soldiers and were sent to infiltrate the soldaderas of Federales camps, befriending them and then stealing critical documents. Although it occasionally happened, it was rare for a soldaderas to become a female soldier.

Women After the War 
After the Revolution, different things happened to the women who fought in the war. Many soldaderas returned to their hometowns and everyday lives with their husbands if they were still alive. While others, specifically Amelio (Amelia) Robles, continued living as a man after the war was. Others moved to Mexico City, such as Garcia Magallanes and Palancares, to continue a life of adventure. Some female soldiers got government veterans' pensions after the war. However, many also could not get pensions, despite many petitions to the Mexican government. When Garcia Magallanes attempted to get a pension for her duties in the military, she was laughed at. Because of the strict gender roles and values deeply embedded in Mexican society, some of these female fighters were not accepted back into their hometown. People were uncomfortable with the fact that women had fought in the war and did not want to acknowledge that that had happened. So, the women who did not feel welcome anymore immigrated to California. Women like Villasana Lopez and Angela Jimenez left Mexico before the revolution was even over in an attempt to escape the violence of the end of the Mexican Revolution. In fact, so many women immigrated that Angela Jimenez was able to form La Organizacion de Veternos de la Revolución de 1910-1920.

Lyrics 
The song "La Adelita" contributed to the notion that soldaderas were only romantic figures during the Revolution.

See also 
 Corrido, a type of narrative song found in Mexican folk music
 Soldaderas, female soldiers who served in the Mexican Revolution
 José Guadalupe Posada

References 

Alicia Arrizón, “Soldaderas and the Staging of the Mexican Revolution,” MIT Press, 1998, Vol. 42, 90-112.

External links 
 Artist's conception of La Adelita
 When Women Took Up Arms to Fight in Mexico's Revolution
 La Adelita - Amparo Ochoa (Revolución Mexicana)

Mexican culture
Spanish-language songs
Mexican folklore
Women in war in Mexico
Mexican corridos
Women in war 1900–1945
1910s songs